Malaspina Provincial Park is a provincial park in British Columbia, Canada, located on the northeast side of the Malaspina Peninsula facing Desolation Sound in the northernmost area of that province's Sunshine Coast region.

References

Provincial parks of British Columbia
Sunshine Coast (British Columbia)
2000 establishments in British Columbia
Protected areas established in 2000